Şifa University is a foundation university with the theme of health, which was founded in 2010 by Turkish medical doctors. It is located in Izmir.

Undergraduate programs 
Şifa University's three schools offer 5 academic departments:

 School of Medicine
 School of Dentistry
 School of Health Sciences
 Department of Physiotherapy and Rehabilitation
 Department of Nutrition and Dietetics  
 Department of Nursery

2016 Purges
Şifa University was one of the 15 universities that were closed down during the 2016 Purges in Turkey due to being associated with Fetullah Gülen.

References

Universities and colleges in Turkey
2010 establishments in Turkey
Educational institutions established in 2010
Defunct universities and colleges in Turkey